Desmoglein-1 is a protein that in humans is encoded by the DSG1 gene. Desmoglein-1 is expressed everywhere in the skin epidermis, but mainly it is expressed in the superficial upper layers of the skin epidermis.

Function 
Desmosomes are cell-cell junctions between epithelial, myocardial and certain other cell types. Desmoglein-1 is a calcium-binding transmembrane glycoprotein component of desmosomes in vertebrate epithelial cells.  Currently, four desmoglein subfamily members have been identified and all are members of the cadherin cell adhesion molecule superfamily. These desmoglein gene family members are located in a cluster on chromosome 18. The protein encoded by this gene has been identified as the autoantigen of the autoimmune skin blistering disease pemphigus foliaceus. It has been found that desmoglein-1 is the target antigen in majority of the cases linked to IgG/IgA pemphigus, which is an autoimmune IgG/IgA antibody mediated response. Desmoglein-1 is also a target of Staphylococcus exotoxins (exfoliatins) A and B which contribute to the pathoaetiology of staphylococcal scalded skin syndrome (SSSS).

Deficiency of the desmoglein-1 protein has been found to be associated with increased expression of multiple genes encoding allergy-related cytokines. Desmoglein-1 is haploinsufficient and a mutation in the gene can cause the autosomal dominant mutation striate palmoplantar keratoderma. In 2013, cases have arisen where the homozygous loss of the desmoglein-1 gene has resulted in a rare syndrome known as SAM syndrome – severe dermatitis, multiple allergies, and metabolic wasting.

Interactions 

Desmoglein-1 has been shown to interact with PKP3, PKP2, and PTPRT (PTPrho)

See also 
 Desmoglein
 List of target antigens in pemphigus
 List of conditions caused by problems with junctional proteins

References

Further reading